Grasøyane Lighthouse is a coastal lighthouse in Ulstein Municipality in Møre og Romsdal, Norway.

History
The lighthouse was first established in 1886, it was damaged during World War II, rebuilt in 1950, and automated in 1986. The lighthouse was listed as a protected site in 1999.

The tower is round and made out of cast iron. This was the last cast iron tower built in Norway (and perhaps the last anywhere). The light emits a white, red or green light (depending on direction) occulting twice every 8 seconds. The light station was automated on its 100th anniversary in 1986.

See also

Lighthouses in Norway
List of lighthouses in Norway
Grasøyane Bird Sanctuary

References

External links
 Norsk Fyrhistorisk Forening 
 Picture of Grasøyane Lighthouse 

Ulstein
Lighthouses completed in 1836
Lighthouses in Møre og Romsdal
Listed lighthouses in Norway